Warnes River, a perennial stream of the Macleay River catchment, is located in the Northern Tablelands district of New South Wales, Australia.

Course and features
Warnes River rises below Mount Werrikimbe, on the eastern slopes of the Great Dividing Range south of Red Hill, and flows generally west northwest then north within Oxley Wild Rivers National Park before reaching its confluence with the Yarrowitch River, northeast of Yarrowitch; descending  over its  course.

See also
 List of rivers of Australia
 Rivers of New South Wales

References

External links
 

Rivers of New South Wales
Northern Tablelands